Pseudogonaxis is a genus of air-breathing land snails, terrestrial pulmonate gastropod mollusks in the subfapily Odontartemoninae of the family Streptaxidae.

Distribution 
The distribution of the genus Pseudogonaxis includes:
 Congo Basin
 Uganda (1 species)

Species
Species within the genus Pseudogonaxis include:
 Pseudogonaxis cavallii (Pollonera, 1906)
 Pseudogonaxis kirkii (Dohrn, 1865)
 † Pseudogonaxis legetetensis Pickford, 2019 
 Pseudogonaxis nseudweensis (Putzeys, 1899)
 Pseudogonaxis percivali (Preston, 1913)
 † Pseudogonaxis protocavallii (Verdcourt, 1963) 
 Pseudogonaxis pusillus (Martens, 1897)
 Pseudogonaxis rendille (Verdcourt, 1963)
 Pseudogonaxis stenostoma (Verdcourt, 1965)
Synonyms
 † Pseudogonaxis protocavalii [sic]: synonym of † Pseudogonaxis protocavallii (Verdcourt, 1963)  (incorrect subsequent spelling)

References

 Bank, R. A. (2017). Classification of the Recent terrestrial Gastropoda of the World. Last update: July 16th, 2017

Streptaxidae